Samosir Regency is a regency in North Sumatra. The regency covers an area of 1,444.25 square kilometres and it had a population of 119,653 at the 2010 census and 136,441 at the 2020 Census. Its seat is the town of Pangururan.

Administrative districts 
The regency is divided administratively into nine districts (kecamatan), tabulated below with their areas and their populations at the 2010 Census and the 2020 Census. The table also includes the locations of the district administrative centres, the number of administrative villages (desa and kelurahan) in each district and its post code.

{| class="sortable wikitable"
|-
! Name  ||Areain km2|| Pop'nCensus2010|| Pop'nCensus2020||Administrative centre ||No. ofvillages||Postcode
|-
| Sianjur Mula Mula ||align="right"|140.24||align="right"|9,138||align="right"|10,003||Ginolat||align="center"|12||22396
|-
| Harian ||align="right"|560.45||align="right"|7,860||align="right"|9,397||Harian Boho||align="center"|13||22391
|-
| Sitio-tio ||align="right"|50.76||align="right"|7,124||align="right"|8,172||Sabulan||align="center"|8||22397
|-
| Onan Runggu ||align="right"|60.89||align="right"|10,329||align="right"|11,122||Onan Runggu||align="center"|12||22398
|-
| Nainggolan ||align="right"|87.86||align="right"|11,849||align="right"|12,871||Nainggolan||align="center"|15||22394
|-
| Palipi ||align="right"|129.55||align="right"|16,087||align="right"|18,209||Mogang ||align="center"|17||22393
|-
| Ronggur Nihuta ||align="right"|94.87||align="right"|8,356||align="right"|9,692||Ronggur Nihuta||align="center"|8||22392
|-
| Pangururan ||align="right"|121.45||align="right"|29,412||align="right"|34,209||Pasar Pangururan||align="center"|28||22390
|-
| Simanindo ||align="right"|198.20||align="right"|19,498||align="right"|22,766||Ambarita||align="center"|21||22395
|-
| Totals ||align="right"|1,444.25||align="right"|119,653||align="right"|136,441||Pangururan||align="center"|134|| 
|}

Six of the nine districts (kecamatan'') within the regency are on the island of Samosir (which lies within Lake Toba), while the others lie on the 'mainland' of Sumatra.

 Samosir Island districts
 Onan Runggu
 Palipi
 Pangururan
 Ronggur Nihuta
 Simanindo
 Nainggolan
 Mainland districts
 Sitio-tio
 Harian
 Sianjur Mula Mula

However, a small part of Pangururan District lies on the mainland, cut off from the rest of the district by the canal.

Botanical Garden
2011: Samosir Regency with supervision from LIPI will build a 100 hectares Botanical Garden. It will finish 10 years later with cost predicted about Rp.73 billion ($8.6 million).

Geo park
A geopark worth Rp20 billion ($2.2 million) is expected to be created - beginning in mid-2012 - in cooperation with the Agency for the Assessment and Application of Technology (BPPT). It has been proposed for incorporation into the world geo park network.

References

Regencies of North Sumatra